Rev. Henry William Watson FRS (25 February 1827, Marylebone, London11 January 1903, Berkswell near Coventry) was a mathematician and author of a number of mathematics books. He was an ordained priest and Cambridge Apostle.

Life
He was born at Marylebone on 25 Feb. 1827.
He was the son of Thomas Watson, R.N., and Eleanor Mary Kingston.

He was educated at King's College London and at Trinity College, Cambridge. 
He graduated as second wrangler and Smith's prizeman in 1850, Dr. W. H. Besant being senior wrangler. 
He became fellow in 1851, and from 1851 to 1853 was assistant tutor. 
Watson formed a close friendship with James Fitzjames Stephen, who entered Trinity in 1847.

He was made a Fellow of the Royal Society in 1881. He and Francis Galton introduced the Galton–Watson process in 1875.

Books by H. W. Watson
 The mathematical theory of electricity and magnetism (Volume 1: electrostatics) (Clarendon, Oxford, 1885–1889) 
 The mathematical theory of electricity and magnetism (Volume 2: magnetism & electrodynamics) (Clarendon, Oxford, 1885–1889)
 A treatise on the application of generalised coordinates to the kinetics of a material system (Clarendon, Oxford, 1879) 
 A treatise on the kinetic theory of gases (Clarendon, Oxford, 1893)

References

External links
 
 

1827 births
1903 deaths
Alumni of King's College London
Alumni of Trinity College, Cambridge
Second Wranglers
Fellows of the Royal Society
19th-century English mathematicians